Verkhnezubrilovsky is a rural locality (a khutor) in Mirnoye Rural Settlement, Novonikolayevsky District, Volgograd Oblast, Russia. The population was 13 as of 2010.

Geography 
Verkhnezubrilovsky is located in steppe, on the Khopyorsko-Buzulukskaya Plain, on the right bank of the Kardail River, 61 km northeast of Novonikolayevsky (the district's administrative centre) by road. Nizhnezubrilovsky is the nearest rural locality.

References 

Rural localities in Novonikolayevsky District